Anthene montana is a butterfly in the family Lycaenidae. It is found in Tanzania (from the eastern part of the country to the Uluguru Mountains).

The upper side of the wings is shiny deep violet blue with a narrow black marginal line on both wings. The underside ground colour is grey with dark brown markings, distinctly outlined with dark brown and white edges.

References

Butterflies described in 1990
Anthene
Endemic fauna of Tanzania
Butterflies of Africa